Iveta Benešová and Barbora Záhlavová-Strýcová were the defending champions, but Benešová decided not to participate.
Záhlavová-Strýcová played alongside Julia Görges, but they lost in the first round to Liezel Huber and Janette Husárová.
Mona Barthel and Sabine Lisicki won the title, defeating Bethanie Mattek-Sands and Sania Mirza in the final, 6–4, 7–5.

Seeds

Draw

Draw

References
 Main Draw

Porsche Tennis Grand Prixandnbsp;- Doubles
2013 Doubles